Šodolovci is a village and a municipality in Osijek-Baranja County in eastern Croatia. In 7 villages of the Šodolovci Municipality there was 1,653 inhabitants at the time of 2011 Census.

Landscape of the Šodolovci Municipality is marked by the Pannonian Basin plains and agricultural fields of maize, wheat, common sunflower and sugar beet.

Name 
The name of the village in Croatian or Serbian is plural.

Geography
Šodolovci Municipality is divided into two parts with village Palača and the largest village Silaš constituting an exclave separated from the rest of municipality by Ernestinovo Municipality and village of Laslovo on its closest point. In addition, Silaš Exclave is in itself de facto pene-enclave as the main road between Palača and Silaš goes through the village of Korođ in neighboring Vukovar-Srijem County. Within the main part of the municipality villages Ada and Paulin Dvor are pene-enclaves. Local road between Šodolovci and Ada is not asphalted which is limiting its use during the bad weather conditions and is reorienting transportation over the Ernestinovo Municipality. There is no bridge on Vuka river between Paulin Dvor and the rest of municipality within its boundaries with nearest roads going through Vladislavci or Ernestinovo Municipality. State road D518 passes through the village of Ada. Other county roads include Ž4109 and Ž4130. Local L209 railway between Vinkovci–Gaboš–Osijek passes through the municipality for a couple of hundreds of meters next to the Palača village yet there is no local station as the village is using local station in Laslovo with which it is physically connected. The territory of the municipality is almost completely flat as it is part of the Pannonian Plain. Southern part of the municipality is mostly covered in forest.

History
Most of the villages in Šodolovci Municipality are in comparison with other settlements in Slavonia relatively new settlements. The village of Šodolovci was originally a pustara, a Pannonian type of hamlet. Village Ada was established in 1921, Palača in 1920, Paulin Dvor in 1922, Petrova Slatina in 1922, Silaš in 1922 and Šodolovci in 1922. The only exception is village Koprivna which was established in 1371. Villages in Šodolovci Municipality were established after the Austria-Hungary was dissolved after the end of World War I and establishment of Kingdom of Serbs, Croats and Slovenes. Some of the military veterans of the Serbian Army who participated in resistance during the 1914 Serbian Campaign of World War I and in 1918 Salonica front great Allied offensive were rewarded with land grants at the area of present-day Šodolovci Municipality.

Croatian War of Independence
The Paulin Dvor massacre was an act of mass murder committed by soldiers of the Croatian Army (HV) in the  village of Paulin Dvor, near the town of Osijek on 11 December 1991 during the Croatian War of Independence. Of the nineteen victims, eighteen were ethnic Serbs, and one was a Hungarian national. The ages of the victims, eight women and eleven men, ranged from 41 to 85. Two former Croatian soldiers were convicted for their role in the killings and were sentenced to 15 and 11 years, respectively. In November 2010, Croatian President Ivo Josipović laid a wreath at the graveyard of the massacre victims and officially apologized for the killings.

Demographics

Population

According to the 2011 census, there are 1,365 Serbs, 248 Croats and 40 others. By mother tongue, there are 885 Croatian speakers, 697 Serbian speakers and 71 speakers of other languages. Out of 1,653 inhabitants 874 (52.87%) were female and 779 (47.13%) male with female plurality in each settlement. Largest age group was between 50–54 years with 179 inhabitants. There was not a single child between 0–4 years old in the village of Paulin Dvor while at the level of municipality in total there were 63 inhabitants in this age group.

Languages

The Serbian language with the Serbian Cyrillic alphabet is the second official language in the municipality of Šodolovci, along with the Croatian language, which is official at the national level. Both Serbian and Croatian language are standardized varieties of the Serbo-Croatian language.

Religion
There are three Serbian Orthodox Churches in Šodolovci Municipality. Those are Church of the Birth of the Most Holy Theotokos in Koprivna, Orthodox Church in Petrova Slatina, and Church of Blessed Prophet Elijah in Silaš. Church of the Birth of the Most Holy Theotokos in Koprivna is a registered monument of architectural heritage from 14th century. This church is a monument of highest category. It was seriously damaged during the Croatian War of Independence.

Politics

Joint Council of Municipalities
The Municipality of Šodolovci is one of seven Serb majority member municipalities within the Joint Council of Municipalities, inter-municipal sui generis organization of ethnic Serb community in eastern Croatia established on the basis of Erdut Agreement. As Serb community constitute majority of the population of the municipality it is represented by 2 delegated Councillors at the Assembly of the Joint Council of Municipalities, double the number of Councilors to the number from Serb minority municipalities in Eastern Croatia.

Settlements
According to the 2011 census, the municipality consists of 7 settlements:

 Ada, population 200
 Koprivna, population 113
 Palača, population 241
 Paulin Dvor, population 76
 Petrova Slatina, population 209
 Silaš, population 476
 Šodolovci, population 338

Economy
Šodolovci is underdeveloped municipality which is statistically classified as the First Category Area of Special State Concern by the Government of Croatia. Šodolovci Municipality's development index is below 50% of national average which is lower than the average for the Osijek-Baranja County which is between 50-75% of national average. There is only 15 registered small businesses in Šodolovci Municipality, 5 in Silaš, 5 in Palača, 3 in Šodolovci and 2 in Petrova Slatina. Those businesses are registered for wholesale and retail trade, agriculture, cereal production, production of plastic products, road transport of goods, accounting, bookkeeping and auditing services and for trade in tobacco products.

Sport
The football club NK Hajduk Veljko named after Hajduk Veljko is located in Šodolovci.

See also
 Joint Council of Municipalities
 List of Croatian municipalities with minority languages in official use

References

Municipalities of Croatia
Slavonia
Joint Council of Municipalities
Serb communities in Croatia